Yelverton Pass is a mountain pass on northern Ellesmere Island, Nunavut, Canada.

References 

Arctic Cordillera
Mountain passes of Qikiqtaaluk Region
Ellesmere Island